Walnut Township is a township in Barton County, Kansas, United States.  As of the 2010 census, its population was 403.

Walnut Township was organized in 1876.

Geography
According to the USGS, it contains one cemetery, Saint Anthony.

The streams of Boot Creek and Dry Creek run through this township.

References
 USGS Geographic Names Information System (GNIS)

External links
 City-Data.com

Townships in Barton County, Kansas
Townships in Kansas